Bukovo can refer to:

 Bukovo (Macedonian: Буково), a village in the Bitola municipality, Republic of North Macedonia
 Bukovo monastery
 Bukovo, Cerkno, Slovenia
 Bukovo, Blagoevgrad Province (Bulgarian: Буково), Bulgaria
 Bukovo, Vologda Oblast, Russia

See also
 Bukowo (disambiguation)